The phrase Bedford limestone has two meanings:
in the USA it refers to Indiana Limestone
in England it refers to Cornbrash